Claire Ellen Max (born September 29, 1946) is a Professor of Astronomy and Astrophysics at the University of California, Santa Cruz (UCSC) and is affiliated with the Lick Observatory. She is the Director of the Center for Adaptive Optics at UCSC.  Max received the E.O. Lawrence Award in Physics.

Biography 
In 1972, Max received her Ph.D. in Astrophysical Sciences from Princeton University, following her B.A. degree in Astronomy from Harvard University, in 1968. Following postdoctoral work at the University of California, Berkeley, Max joined the scientific staff of the Lawrence Livermore National Laboratory in 1974, working on problems in plasma physics relating to fusion technology.  In 1984, she became the founding Director of the Livermore branch of the UC Institute of Geophysics and Planetary Physics, and in 1995, she became the Director of University Relations. She joined the faculty at UCSC in 2001.

Max is best known for her contributions to the theory of adaptive optics as a technique for reducing the optical distortions of images taken through the turbulent atmosphere. This work began at the JASON Defense Advisory Group, which she joined in 1983 as its first female member. With her colleagues in JASON, she developed the idea of using an artificial laser guide star to correct astronomical images. In addition to continuing to develop this technology at the Center for Adaptive Optics, she uses adaptive optics to study active galactic nuclei as well as planets in the Solar System.

Awards and honors

 Fellow, American Physical Society
 Fellow, American Association for the Advancement of Science
 Fellow, SPIE
2002, Fellow of the American Academy of Arts and Sciences
2003, Woman of the Year in Science, Alameda County (CA) Women's Hall of Fame
2004, E.O. Lawrence Award in Physics, U.S. Department of Energy, for her contributions to the theory of laser adaptive optics and the applications of adaptive optics to ground-based astronomy
2005, Hartnell College, Salinas, CA: “President’s Partnership of Excellence” Award
2006, Science Award, Chabot Space and Science Center, Oakland CA
 2008, National Academy of Sciences
2009, James Madison Medal, Princeton University
2015, Joseph Weber Award for Astronomical Instrumentation, American Astronomical Society
2020, Legacy Fellow of the American Astronomical Society.

See also
List of women in leadership positions on astronomical instrumentation projects

References

External links
 Dr. Max's page @ UCSC
 UC Santa Cruz article about Claire Max
 The Center for Adaptive Optics
 
 Claire Max's Non-technical Talk in the Silicon Valley Astronomy Lecture Series

1946 births
Living people
American women astronomers
Fellows of the American Academy of Arts and Sciences
Fellows of the American Association for the Advancement of Science
Lick Observatory
Harvard University alumni
Princeton University alumni
University of California, Santa Cruz faculty
Members of the United States National Academy of Sciences
Women planetary scientists
Planetary scientists
Fellows of the American Astronomical Society